Krikor Agathon (26 November 1900 – c. November 1979) was an Egyptian sport shooter and épée fencer. He competed at two Olympic Games. He later worked as a sports administrator in Egypt and France, and was awarded with the Legion of Honour.

References

External links
 

1900 births
1979 deaths
Egyptian male épée fencers
Egyptian male sport shooters
Olympic fencers of Egypt
Olympic shooters of Egypt
Fencers at the 1924 Summer Olympics
Shooters at the 1924 Summer Olympics
Shooters at the 1936 Summer Olympics
Sportspeople from Alexandria
Chevaliers of the Légion d'honneur
20th-century Egyptian people